Daniel Lewis Hansford (March 1, 1960 – May 2, 1981) was an American shooting victim who was killed by his employer, historic preservationist and antiques dealer Jim Williams, at Williams' home in Savannah, Georgia, United States. His death was documented in John Berendt's 1994 non-fiction book Midnight in the Garden of Good and Evil and its 1997 film adaptation. After four trials, Williams was acquitted of Hansford's murder.

Early life
Danny Hansford was born in Savannah, Georgia, to Emily Bannister. He was one of three sons, the others being John and William.

Shooting
In the early hours of May 2, 1981, Hansford and Jim Williams had an argument at Williams's residence at Mercer House, in Monterey Square, Savannah, Georgia. During the argument, Hansford, of whom Williams had been a sexual partner for about two years, pushed over an 18th-century English grandfather clock. Williams was in his study at the time, and Hansford soon entered, whereupon he drew a gun on Williams. The gun jammed upon firing, however, and Williams pulled a 9mm Luger pistol from his desk and shot Hansford in what he claimed was self-defense. Prosecutors claimed Williams then proceeded to stage the crime scene to make it appear as if Hansford had actually fired at him. Williams called the police at 3:00 A.M. to report the shooting, just over half an hour after the incident occurred. He was taken into custody and charged with murder. Superior Court Judge Eugene H. Gadsden set Williams' bond at $25,000, which he soon posted.

Hansford, 21, was buried in Greenwich Cemetery, which is adjacent to Bonaventure Cemetery in Savannah. He is buried beside his mother, who died in 2005 at age 65.

Trials
Williams was tried four times, a record for the state of Georgia. Bobby Lee Cook defended Williams during the first trial in 1982, presided over by Judge George Oliver. Williams was convicted and sentenced to life in prison. He appealed, posting the $100,000 bond. Cook later anonymously received a copy of the police report showing that the arresting officer had contradicted himself about a bullet hole in a floor in Mercer House. The verdict was overturned in January 1983 by the Georgia Supreme Court and a new trial was ordered. As Berendt wrote in his book: "The ruling appeared to be little more than a temporary reprieve. The hole in the floor had been unimportant in the trial; the main points of evidence in Spencer Lawton's case against Williams still remained intact."

Sonny Seiler assumed Williams' defense at the second trial beginning in September 1983 and decided to have Williams openly bring up his sexuality. Little else differed from the first trial: on October 8, Williams was again found guilty and sentenced to life imprisonment. In June 1985, the Georgia Supreme Court overturned the conviction again, stating that the sheriff should not have been allowed to testify as an expert, and that the prosecutor waited until his closing argument to demonstrate some evidence.

The third trial, held in the spring of 1987, resulted in a mistrial. New evidence showed Hansford's hands were not bagged by the police at the crime scene, which meant that if there was gunpowder residue present on the victim's hands it could have been rubbed off during the subsequent movement of the body. During deliberations, a juror supposedly called a paramedic to ask some medical questions, though it could not be proven. After two deliberations, the jury still had not reached a verdict, with one woman adamantly insisting she saw reasonable doubt and would not alter her verdict. On June 9, 1987, with 11-1 jurors in favor of a "guilty" verdict, it was declared a hung jury.

The fourth and final trial, which was moved to Augusta, resulted in Williams' acquittal in May 1989, eight years after his conviction, after the jury's hour-long deliberation.

On January 14, 1990, after eight months of being a free man, Williams collapsed and died at home. He is believed to have died in his study, the scene of the shooting.

Midnight in the Garden of Good and Evil
Hansford was renamed Billy Hanson in the 1997 Clint Eastwood-directed movie adaptation of the book, in which he was portrayed by Jude Law.

References

External links
Danny Lewis Hansford at FindAGrave.com
A mugshot of Hansford

1981 controversies in the United States
1981 in Georgia (U.S. state)
Deaths by firearm in Georgia (U.S. state)
Deaths by person in Georgia (U.S. state)
Defensive gun use
History of Savannah, Georgia
May 1981 events in the United States
1960 births
1981 deaths